Apodiphus is a genus of shield bugs belonging to the family Pentatomidae, subfamily Pentatominae.

Species
 Apodiphus amygdali (Germar, 1817)
 Apodiphus integriceps Horváth, 1888
 Apodiphus murgbzarus Ghauri
 Apodiphus pallidus (Hoberlandt, 1959)

References
 BioLib
 Fauna Europaea

Pentatomidae genera
Halyini
Taxa named by Maximilian Spinola